Keal may refer to:

People with the name
Clifford Keal (1901–1965), Australian rules footballer
Minna Keal (1909–1999), British composer
Keal Carlile (born 1990), English rugby league player

Places
Keal Cotes, a village in England
 East Keal, a village in England

Other uses 
 KEAL, a radio station of California

See also 

Keel (disambiguation)
Keele (disambiguation)
Kiel (disambiguation)
Kil (disambiguation)
Kile (disambiguation)
Kill (disambiguation)
Kyl (disambiguation)
Kyle (disambiguation)
Kyll